The Shannara Chronicles is an American fantasy drama television series created by Alfred Gough and Miles Millar. It is an adaptation of The Sword of Shannara trilogy of fantasy novels by Terry Brooks. It follows three heroes as they protect an ancient tree to stop the escape of banished demons. The series was filmed in the Auckland Film Studios and on location elsewhere in New Zealand.

The first season of The Shannara Chronicles premiered on MTV in the United States on January 5, 2016, and consisted of 10 episodes. MTV originally greenlit a second season in April 2016; however, in May 2017, it was announced that the series would relocate to Spike (now Paramount Network). The second season premiered on October 11, 2017, and concluded November 22, 2017. On January 16, 2018, it was announced that the series had been cancelled after two seasons and that the producers were shopping the series to other networks. The series was later considered officially concluded.

Plot

Season one of The Shannara Chronicles roughly follows the storylines set out in the novel The Elfstones of Shannara, (the second book of the Shannara trilogy) set in the fictional Four Lands. As the series opens, demons start to return after having been banished from this world to a place known as the Forbidding—locked by an ancient tree called the Ellcrys. The series chronicles the journey of Wil, Amberle, and Eretria who, with the guidance of the last druid Allanon, must go on a quest to protect the Ellcrys from dying and releasing all the banished demons back into the Four Lands.

Cast and characters

Main
 Austin Butler as Wil Ohmsford, a half-human/half-elf who is the last of the bloodline of the ancient Shannara family. He is destined to help save the Four Lands from demons. He possesses three Elfstones, which belonged to his late father, Shea Ohmsford.
 Poppy Drayton as Amberle Elessedil, the Elven Princess and the first female to be accepted as one of the Chosen, a group of elves responsible for protecting and caring for the Ellcrys tree. Amberle becomes Wil's lover before she sacrifices herself to save the Ellcrys and the Four Lands.
 Ivana Baquero as Eretria, a human who was raised by Rovers, a band of thieves. Although at first untrustworthy, she later becomes a stalwart ally of the group. She also has romantic feelings for Wil, and becomes involved with the Princess of Leah, Lyria, in the second season.
 Manu Bennett as Allanon, a human and the last druid who has been alive for more than 300 years through the use of Druid Sleep. He guides and mentors the group on their quest to protect the Ellcrys. In season 2, Bennett also portrays the Warlock Lord.
 Aaron Jakubenko as Ander Elessedil, youngest son of King Eventine, who has a reputation for being irresponsible, due to the death of older brother Aine, as he blames himself for his brother's death, despite the fact it was not his fault. However, after his father and other brother Arion have also died, Ander becomes king of the elves; finally abandoning his irresponsible party boy nature, becoming the responsible ruler his kingdom needs.
 Marcus Vanco as Bandon, an Elven boy with the gift of a seer, meaning that he can see possible futures when he touches someone. He follows a dark path in the second season.
 Malese Jow as Mareth Ravenlock (season 2), a half-human/half-elf searching for Allanon because she believes herself to be his daughter. She, too eventually develops romantic feelings towards Wil.
 Vanessa Morgan as Lyria (season 2), a human who is in a romantic relationship with Eretria, and who is revealed to be the Princess of Leah.
 Gentry White as Garet Jax (season 2), a bounty hunter looking for Lyria for her mother, the Queen of Leah. Later on he joins Wil's group in saving the Four Lands.

Recurring
 James Remar as Cephelo (season 1), the leader of the Rovers and adoptive father of Eretria. Upon first seeing Wil's Elfstones, Cephelo becomes obsessed with them. Despite his self-serving nature, he later helps Amberle on her quest.
 Daniel MacPherson as Arion Elessedil (season 1), oldest living son of King Eventine and heir to the Elven throne. Arion is known to be hot-tempered and often disagrees with his father's commands.
 Jed Brophy as the Dagda Mor (season 1), an ancient elvish druid who turned into a demon. His powers increase as the Ellcrys dies, and as such he uses lesser demons as henchmen and proxies.
 Brooke Williams as Catania, an elf who is Amberle's handmaiden. She later becomes the love interest of Ander.
 Emelia Burns as Commander Diana Tilton (season 1), the captain of the Black Watch, the elite unit of the Elven military whose sworn duty is to protect the Ellcrys. She is romantically involved with Arion and was previously in love with Ander.
 Mark Mitchinson as Flick Ohmsford, Wil's uncle and Shea's brother. He is kidnapped by Bandon during the series' second season.
 John Rhys-Davies as Eventine Elessedil (season 1), Amberle's grandfather who has been king of the Elven Kingdom of Arborlon for decades. After the death of his oldest son (Amberle's father), Eventine began grooming his son Arion for the throne. However, in the wake of the demon threat, he decides that the hot-headed Arion is not yet ready to rule.
 Jared Turner (season 1) and Glen Levy (season 2) as Slanter, the Gnome resistance leader who murdered Amberle's father 10 years previously. He reluctantly agrees to help Ander and Tilton find the source of the demons in exchange for his release from prison. Slanter shares his name with a character from The Wishsong of Shannara.
 James Trevena-Brown as Captain Crispin Edensong (season 1), captain of the Home Guard, the personal corps of Elven Hunters beholden to the king or queen of the elves. Charged with protecting Amberle. Captain of the Elven Army.
 Andrew Grainger as Cogline (season 2), a former druid whose mission is to protect Eretria from any threat; he trains her to defend herself against evil forces.
Desmond Chiam as General Riga (season 2), the leader of the Crimson, who is dedicated to eradicating the use of magic across the Four Lands.
 Erroll Shand as Valcaa (season 2), Riga's right-hand man.
Kelvin Taylor as Crimson 3, General Riga's third in command.
 Caroline Chikezie as Queen Tamlin (season 2), the formidable leader of the human Kingdom of Leah, and Lyria's estranged mother.

Episodes

Series overview

Season 1 (2016)

Season 2 (2017)

Production

Conception and development
Sonar Entertainment and Farah Films acquired the TV rights to the Shannara universe in 2012. In December 2013, it was announced that a series based on the books was being produced for MTV and had been given a straight-to-series, 10-episode order. On April 20, 2016, MTV greenlit a second season of The Shannara Chronicles.

The series is produced by Dan Farah, Jon Favreau, Miles Millar, Al Gough, Jonathan Liebesman, and author Terry Brooks. Brooks has stated in an interview that he is happy with the way his story has been adapted. Much like the television adaptation of A Song of Ice and Fire, the series will not be a direct adaptation following the narrative order of the books, but will feature a mix of the books' stories. The first book of the series to be adapted is The Elfstones of Shannara, the second book in the trilogy, with some elements of the other novels being gradually adapted to the show.

Casting
In December 2014, it was announced that Manu Bennett would star as Allanon and in January 2015 Ivana Baquero, Austin Butler, Poppy Drayton, Emelia Burns and John Rhys-Davies joined the show. Malese Jow, Vanessa Morgan, Gentry White, Desmond Chiam and Caroline Chikezie joined the cast as series regulars in season two.

Filming
Filming for the 10-episode first season wrapped in New Zealand at Auckland Film Studios in June 2015, and the first trailer debuted on July 10, 2015. Filming for the second season, which also consists of 10 episodes, began January 31, 2017, in New Zealand.

Music
The opening theme song, "Until We Go Down", from the EP "Up in Flames", is performed by Ruelle. Other songs featured in the show's first season include "Midnight" by Coldplay, "You Are a Memory" by Message to Bears, "Wave" by Beck and "Run Boy Run" by Woodkid.

Release
During The Shannara Chronicles panel at San Diego Comic-Con International in July 2015, a teaser trailer was revealed, giving audiences a first look at the sets and characters. A television version of the trailer was shown during the 2015 MTV Video Music Awards.

Broadcast
The Shannara Chronicles premiered on MTV in the United States on January 5, 2016, with a two-hour series premiere. New episodes were broadcast every Tuesday at 10 pm ET. The third and fourth episodes were released online after the first two episodes aired on January 5, 2016, prior to their original broadcast schedule.

The series was simulcast on MTV in Canada. The two-hour pilot also aired on Bell Media sister network CTV on Wednesday, January 6, 2016. The series has also been licensed to a number of different countries, including the United Kingdom (airing on 5STAR), Australia (Syfy) and New Zealand (Sky TV).

Cancellation 
On January 16, 2018, it was announced that the series had been cancelled after two seasons. Producers later announced that the series is being shopped to other networks. The series was later considered officially concluded.

Reception

Critical response
The Shannara Chronicles has received mixed reviews, receiving a 52/100 score on Metacritic, based on 15 reviews and a 54% for season 1 on Rotten Tomatoes based on 26 reviews, with an average rating of 5.2/10. The site's critical consensus reads: "The Shannara Chronicles wears its influences heavily on its sleeve and needs to find surer footing before it can tap its true potential, but it still might suffice for viewers in search of a teen-friendly Game of Thrones." The second season received a 100% approval rating based on five reviews.

Neil Genzlinger of The New York Times wrote: "So give this reasonably absorbing series a little credit, even though it often seems to be merely reworking various fantasy formulas. It moves quickly and does a nice job of weaving together two story lines involving an elfin world that is threatened when a giant tree, known as the Ellcrys, begins to die." Maureen Ryan of Variety wrote: "Sure, Shannara, which harks back to the golden age of syndicated genre fare, is a standard quest journey in which there are trolls, gnomes, living trees and magic books, and characters say things like, 'If Allanon is here, there are dark days ahead.' But there's conviction in the show's execution."

Ratings

Season 1 (2016)

Season 2 (2017)

Accolades
The series was nominated for a Saturn Award for "Best Fantasy TV Series" for the 2015–2016 season.

References

External links
 
 

2010s American teen drama television series
2010s American LGBT-related drama television series
2016 American television series debuts
2017 American television series endings
American fantasy television series
Bisexuality-related television series
English-language television shows
Fiction about interracial romance
High fantasy television series
Lesbian-related television shows
MTV original programming
Post-apocalyptic television series
Shannara
Spike (TV network) original programming
Television shows based on American novels
Television series set in the 6th millennium
Television shows set in San Francisco
Television shows filmed in New Zealand
Television series created by Alfred Gough
Television series created by Miles Millar